Arctotis fastuosa, called Monarch-of-the-veld, is a species of African  plants in the family Asteraceae, native to Namibia and South Africa. It has become naturalized on roadsides and in vacant urban lots in southern California.

Arctotis fastuosa is cultivated as an ornamental plant for its showy flowers. It is an annual herb growing up to about 35 centimeters in height, but known to approach 90 centimeters (36 inches) at times. It is hairy in texture, the hairs long and webby when the plant is young. Leaves occur in basal rosettes and are alternately arranged along the stem. They can be several centimeters long all but the uppermost are divided into several lobes. They are borne on flat petioles with wide bases. The inflorescence is a solitary flower head which can be large and showy, measuring up to 10 centimeters wide. Cultivars are bred for varied flower colors; the ray florets can be orange or white with purple, yellow, or orange bases, and the disc florets at the center can be brown, purple, or black.

References

External links
iSpot, I Share Nature, Observations in the Species: Arctotis fastuosa, Common Name: Bittergousblom photos of Arctotis fastuosa in the wild in South Africa
Венидиум пышный (Арктотис) (Venidium fastuosum, Arctotis fastuosa) in Russian with photos
Calphotos Photo gallery, Venidium fastuosum, University of California
Calflora taxon report, University of California, Venidium fastuosum  (Jacq.) Stapf, monarch of the veld,  cape daisy 

fastuosa
Flora of Southern Africa
Plants described in 1797
~
Taxa named by Nikolaus Joseph von Jacquin